Stranje pri Velikem Gabru is a settlement in the Municipality of Trebnje in eastern Slovenia. It lies on the Temenica River just north of Veliki Gaber. The area is part of the historical region of Lower Carniola. The municipality is now included in the Southeast Slovenia Statistical Region.

Name
The name of the settlement was changed from Stranje to Stranje pri Velikem Gabru in 1953. In the past the German name was Straindorf.

Cultural heritage
A Roman-period burial ground was excavated in the settlement between 1885 and 1903. Fifty graves were documented.

References

External links
Stranje pri Velikem Gabru at Geopedia

Populated places in the Municipality of Trebnje